Rebecca Ferguson is an English singer from Liverpool. She rose to fame in 2010 when she finished as the runner-up behind Matt Cardle in the seventh series of The X Factor in 2010. Ferguson's discography so far consists of four studio albums, fourteen  singles, one extended play and eleven music videos. After two years of both critical and commercial success in the music industry, Ferguson has sold over 1 million albums worldwide.

Heaven, Ferguson's debut studio album, was released in December 2011. The album charted at number 3 on the UK Albums Chart and has been certified double platinum by the British Phonographic Industry (BPI) with a total number of sales of 536,960. The album debuted at number 9 in Ireland and has certified platinum. Heaven also has charted Internationally successfully with it peaking at number 7 in Switzerland, Number 6 in the Netherlands and making the top 20 in Australia peaking at number 14 and making the top 30 in both New Zealand and Italy, as well as charting in many other countries including the United States. Her debut single, "Nothing's Real but Love", charted at number 10 on the UK Singles Chart and 23 on the Irish Singles Chart. The song has also charted internationally, peaking at number 14 in Australia. The next single from the album was "Too Good to Lose" which was released on 4 March 2012. 
However, due to poor publicity, the single charted only at number 186 in the UK. In April, it was confirmed that "Glitter & Gold" was to be the third single taken from the album and was released on 29 April 2012, it peaked to number 116 on the UK Singles Chart and has also charted at 27 in Italy and 65 on the Irish Singles Chart. The fourth single from the album "Backtrack" was released a day before the deluxe edition of Heaven on the 14 October 2012. The deluxe edition of Heaven featured five new songs.

Freedom, Ferguson's second studio album,  was released in December 2013. The album was preceded by the release of lead single "I Hope", the song peaked to number 15 on the UK Singles Chart. "Light On" was released in German-speaking Europe on 28 December 2013 as the second single from the album. "All That I've Got" was released on 2 March 2014 as the second UK single (third overall) from the album.

Lady Sings the Blues, Ferguson's third studio album was released in March 2015. The album charted in the Top Ten of two countries.

Albums

Studio albums

Extended plays

Singles

As lead artist

As featured artist

Promotional singles

Soundtracks

Music videos

Notes

References

Discographies of British artists